The Senior Wrangler is the top mathematics undergraduate at the University of Cambridge in England, a position which has been described as "the greatest intellectual achievement attainable in Britain."

Specifically, it is the person who achieves the highest overall mark among the Wranglers – the students at Cambridge who gain first-class degrees in mathematics. The Cambridge undergraduate mathematics course, or Mathematical Tripos, is famously difficult.

Many Senior Wranglers have become world-leading figures in mathematics, physics, and other fields. They include George Airy, Jacob Bronowski, Christopher Budd, Kevin Buzzard, Arthur Cayley, Donald Coxeter, Arthur Eddington, Ben Green, John Herschel, James Inman, J. E. Littlewood, Lee Hsien Loong, Jayant Narlikar, Morris Pell, John Polkinghorne, Frank Ramsey, Lord Rayleigh (John Strutt), Sir George Stokes, Isaac Todhunter, Sir Gilbert Walker, and James H. Wilkinson.

Senior Wranglers were once fêted with torchlit processions and took pride of place in the University's graduation ceremony. Years in Cambridge were often remembered by who had been Senior Wrangler that year.

The annual ceremony in which the Senior Wrangler becomes known was first held in the 18th century. Standing on the balcony of the University's Senate House, the examiner reads out the class results for mathematics, and printed copies of the results are then thrown to the audience below. The examiner no longer announces the students' exact rankings, but they still identify the Senior Wrangler, nowadays by tipping their academic hat when reading out the person's name.

Others who finished in the top 12
Those who have achieved second place, known as Second Wranglers, include Alfred Marshall, James Clerk Maxwell, J. J. Thomson, Lord Kelvin, William Clifford, and William Whewell.

Those who have finished between third and 12th include Archibald Hill, Karl Pearson and William Henry Bragg (third), George Green, G. H. Hardy, and Alfred North Whitehead (fourth), Adam Sedgwick (fifth), John Venn (sixth), Bertrand Russell, Nevil Maskelyne and Sir James Timmins Chance (seventh), Thomas Malthus (ninth), and John Maynard Keynes and William Henry Fox Talbot (12th).

History
Between 1748 and 1909, the University publicly announced the ranking, which was then reported in newspapers such as The Times. The examination was considered to be by far the most important in Britain and the Empire. The prestige of being a high Wrangler was great; the respect accorded to the Senior Wrangler was immense. Andrew Warwick, author of Masters of Theory, describes the term 'Senior Wrangler' as "synonymous with academic supremacy".

Since 1910, successful students in the examinations have been told their rankings privately, and not all Senior Wranglers have become publicly known as such. In recent years, the custom of discretion regarding ranking has progressively vanished, and all Senior Wranglers since 2010 have announced their identity publicly.

The youngest person to be Senior Wrangler is probably Arran Fernandez, who came top in 2013, aged 18 years and 0 months. The previous youngest was probably James Wilkinson in 1939, aged 19 years and nine months. The youngest up to 1909 were Alfred Flux in 1887, aged 20 years and two months and Peter Tait in 1852, aged 20 years and eight months.

Two individuals have placed first without becoming known as Senior Wrangler. One was the student Philippa Fawcett in 1890. At that time, although the University allowed women to take the examinations, it did not allow them to be members of the University, nor to receive degrees. Therefore they could not be known as 'Wranglers', and were merely told how they had performed compared to the male candidates, for example, "equal to the Third Wrangler", or "between the Seventh and Eighth Wranglers". Having gained the highest mark, Fawcett was declared to have finished "above the Senior Wrangler".

The other was the mathematics professor George Pólya. As he had contributed to reforming the Tripos with the aim that an excellent performance would be less dependent on solving hard problems and more so on showing a broad mathematical understanding and knowledge, G.H. Hardy asked Pólya to sit the examinations himself, unofficially, during his stay in England in 1924–5. Pólya did so, and to Hardy's surprise, received the highest mark, an achievement which, had he been a student, would have made him the Senior Wrangler.

Derived uses of the term
Senior Wrangler's Walk is a path in Cambridge, the walk to and along which was considered to be sufficient constitutional exercise for a student aspiring to become the Senior Wrangler. The route was shorter than other walks, such as Wranglers' Walk and the Grantchester Grind, undertaken by undergraduates whose aspirations were lower.

Senior Wrangler sauce is a Cambridge term for brandy butter, a type of hard sauce made from brandy, butter, and sugar, traditionally served in Britain with Christmas pudding and warm mince pies.

Senior Wrangler is also the name of a solitaire card game, alternatively known as Mathematics and Double Calculation, played with two decks of cards and involving elementary modular arithmetic.

Literary references 
Fictional Senior Wranglers appearing in novels include Roger Hamley, a character in Elizabeth Gaskell's Wives and Daughters, and Tom Jericho, the cryptanalyst in Robert Harris's novel Enigma, who is described as having been Senior Wrangler in 1938. In Catherine Hall's The Proof of Love, Victor Turner is listed as having been Senior Wrangler in 1968.

In George Bernard Shaw's play Mrs. Warren's Profession, the title character's daughter Vivie is praised for "tieing with the third wrangler," and she comments that "the mathematical tripos" means "grind, grind, grind for six to eight hours a day at mathematics, and nothing but mathematics."

In Ford Madox Ford's Parade's End, the character Christopher Tietjens is described as having settled deliberately for only being Second Wrangler, in order to avoid the weight of expectation that the title would create.

In his Discworld series of novels, Terry Pratchett has a character called the Senior Wrangler, a faculty member at the Unseen University, whose first name is Horace.

The compiler of crosswords for The Leader in the 1930s used 'Senior Wrangler' as a pseudonym.

Coaches 
The two most successful 19th-century coaches of Senior Wranglers were William Hopkins and Edward Routh. Hopkins, the 'Senior Wrangler Maker', who himself was the 7th Wrangler, coached 17 Senior Wranglers. Routh, who had himself been the Senior Wrangler, coached 27.  Another, described by his student (and Senior Wrangler) J.E. Littlewood as "the last of the great coaches", was another Senior Wrangler, Robert Alfred Herman.

Senior Wranglers and runners up, 1748–1909 
During 1748–1909, the top two colleges in terms of number of Senior Wranglers were Trinity and St John's with 56 and 54 respectively. Gonville and Caius was third with 13.

Senior Wranglers since 1910 

Senior Wranglers since 1910 also include:
 David Hobson (Christ's College) (1940s)
 Peter Swinnerton-Dyer (Trinity College) (1940s)
 Jack Leeming (St John's College)
 Michael Hall (Trinity College) (1950s)

See also 
 Wooden spoon (award)

Notes

References

Bibliography 
 
 
 
 
 

History of the University of Cambridge
Lists of people associated with the University of Cambridge
Lists of mathematicians by award